Lade is a coastal hamlet in the county of Kent, England.

Lade is adjacent to, and north of, Lydd-on-Sea. It had a railway station on the Romney, Hythe and Dymchurch Railway which is now closed.

References

Hamlets in Kent
Beaches of Kent
Lydd